Reload is the 34th album by Tom Jones, released in 1999. It contains fifteen duets with a range of artists including Van Morrison, Cerys Matthews, Stereophonics, Robbie Williams and Portishead, recorded with their usual record producers and in their usual studios. The tracks are mainly cover versions, with a new version of one of Jones' own songs, "Looking Out My Window" (1968), and one original track, "Sex Bomb".

Reload became the highest seller of Jones' career, reaching number one on the UK Albums Chart in 1999 and again in 2000. Its biggest single was the collaboration with Mousse T, "Sex Bomb", which reached number 3 on the UK Singles Chart, and was later used in a 2003 episode of The Simpsons (a show Jones had guest starred on in 1992). The album has sold more than four million copies worldwide. The album was not released in the US; instead the compilation Reloaded: Greatest Hits was issued there in 2003 and featured highlights from Reload.

Release
The album was released on 16 September 1999 in the UK by Gut Records and was released a little later in the US by V2 Records. Five singles were released from the album: "Burning Down the House" (September 1999), "Baby, It's Cold Outside" (December 1999), "Mama Told Me Not to Come" (March 2000), "Sex Bomb" (May 2000), and "You Need Love Like I Do" (November 2000)

Reception

Reload became the highest seller of Jones' career, reaching number one on the UK Albums Chart in 1999 and again in 2000. As of April 2021, has sold nearly 1.5 million copies.

Track listing

Note
 A "special edition" release of the album also includes remixes of "Sex Bomb" and "You Need Love Like I Do" as bonus tracks.

Charts

Weekly charts

Year-end charts

Certifications and sales

Notes

References

External links
Official Website

1999 albums
Vocal duet albums
Tom Jones (singer) albums
V2 Records albums
Gut Records albums